Minister of State for Home Affairs may refer to

 Minister of State of Home Affairs (India)
 Minister of State for Home Affairs (United Kingdom)
 Parliamentary Under-Secretary of State for the Home Department, UK